Josh Conklin (born June 19, 1979) is an American college football coach. He served as head football coach of Wofford College in Spartanburg, South Carolina from 2018 until midway through the 2022 season. Conklin served as the defensive coordinator at the University of Pittsburgh from 2015 to 2017. He played college football at Dakota State College in Madison, South Dakota.

Conklin and Wofford parted ways five games in to the 2022 season after the Terriers got off to an 0–5 start.

Head coaching record

References

1979 births
Living people
American football linebackers
Dakota State Trojans football players
FIU Panthers football coaches
Pittsburgh Panthers football coaches
South Dakota State Jackrabbits football coaches
Tennessee Volunteers football coaches
The Citadel Bulldogs football coaches
Wofford Terriers football coaches